Playing It Cool is a 2014 American romantic comedy film directed by Justin Reardon and written by Chris Shafer and Paul Vicknair. The film stars Chris Evans, Michelle Monaghan. The film was released on video on demand on March 31, 2015 before a limited release on May 8, 2015 by Vertical Entertainment. It received generally negative reviews from critics.

Plot
Me is a screenwriter in LA who wants to write action flicks, but his agent, Bryan, needs him to write a rom-com first. Due to mother abandonment issues from his childhood, he doesn't let love in or believe in it, so finds writing about romance difficult.

His buddy Scott is obsessed with romantic books and movies. He’s had a crush for ages on a guy who works at a bookshop. He is tortured, hoping the feelings could be reciprocated.

Me wants to show love as it is in his perspective, not funny nor romantic. Every time anyone has told him they love him, he says he doesn’t think he’d be able to reciprocate. So, he constantly hooks up and then says he doesn’t see a future with them

Then Me meets Her at a charity event, bantering together with ease. Me finds himself really drawn to Her, but suddenly they meet her boyfriend ‘Stuffy’, and she gets whisked away. When he tries to get her out of his head by hooking up quickly with anyone else, for the first time it doesn’t work. He goes back to the venue to see if he can get her name, but there is no one left to ask. Desperate, he steals the guest book.

His misfit group of friends are all writers: Lyle is prolific yet still unpublished, Samson is a married graphic novelist, Mallory writes and performs one woman shows she makes them attend and of course Scott. Me tells them he is trying to find Her. Most are cynical about marriage and love, while Scott is supportive.

Me goes to see his granddad, who tells him he must search like Columbo. Me and Scott makes the rounds of charity events, hoping to run into Her. After a plethora of events, he is embarrassed at one when the host puts Me on the spot to talk about works that he has previously bragged (lied) about. Her is actually at the event, so they reconnect, and he gets her to agree to a ‘friend date’. Afterwards, when he gives her a lift home, she mentions an upcoming charity event.

The next day, Scott is again his only friend supportive supportive of love; his other friends try to dissuade him, with Mallory openly hostile.

When he shows up for the event, to find it is actually her yoga class. Their connection continues to strengthen. Chatting in a café, he asks her about ‘Stuffy.’ She describes him as stable, safe and liked by her family and friends. Her dream wedding is at one of the heart sculptures in San Francisco. Me finally confesses that he ‘likes’ her, which she says won’t change her plan.

At home, he takes out his shoebox, looking at the goodbye note his mother had left him. At handball the next day his granddad and Scott convince him not to give up on Her. That evening, when he convinces her to go out, she talks about her dad’s suicide when she was young, and they kiss.

She calls him up because she can’t get him out of her head, and before long, they end up in bed together. For the first time, he doesn’t feel guilty. Her, on the other hand, leaves feeling badly. She calls again, everything is going well, until his dishonesty about the charities surfaces and she stomps away. Mallory finally confesses she loves him when he asks her for help. The next morning, She wakes him with a call, only to confess she is already engaged.

A night of binging, followed by making a fool of himself at her apartment and his granddad dying, gets him back on track. His writer's block melts away and the rom-com gets done. Scott finally gets a date with that guy, Mallory gives a ‘friend’ a chance. Me realizes he has to try to stop the wedding. After a flight, cliché run through an airport and a taxi ride, and checking all of the heart sculptures, Me finds Her

The ending message: Love isn’t a thinking thing, it’s a feeling thing. Live your own story.

Cast 

In addition, Ashley Tisdale and Matthew Morrison make cameo appearances as themselves.

Production

Pre-production
The script for the film was originally titled A Many Splintered Thing and was first on The Black List and was a 2011 finalist for the Nicholl Fellowship.

Filming
The film began filming in late 2012 in Los Angeles and completed in early 2013. The film is produced by Voltage Pictures and Wonderland Sound and Vision.

Release
The international trailer was released on September 17, 2014.

The film was released in Estonia on September 26, 2014, Latvia on October 17, 2014, South Korea on October 23, 2014 and Romania on December 26, 2014.

On November 5, 2014 it was announced Vertical Entertainment had acquired US distribution rights for the film with a planned 2015 release. In February 2015, the film was released exclusively on DirecTV Cinema. In Canada, on February 27, 2015, the film received a limited release in theatres and was released on video on demand. The film was released on video on demand on March 31, 2015 before a limited release on May 8, 2015.

The film premiered at the Dallas International Film Festival on April 11, 2015.

Reception

Critical response

Box office
Playing It Cool grossed $1.3 million at the box office.

References

External links 
 

2014 films
Wonderland Sound and Vision films
2014 romantic comedy films
American romantic comedy films
Films set in Los Angeles
Films about writers
Voltage Pictures films
Vertical Entertainment films
Films scored by Jake Monaco
Films shot in Los Angeles
2010s English-language films
2010s American films